The Vice Chief of the Air Staff (VCAS) is the deputy to the Chief of the Air Staff of India and second-highest ranking officer of the Indian Air Force. The VCAS is a PSO (Principal Staff Officer) at Air Headquarters at New Delhi. In the event that the Chief of Air Staff (CAS) is absent or is unable to perform his duties, the VCAS assumes the duties and responsibilities of the CAS. 
The VCAS is normally held by an officer of three star rank and is held by an air officer of the rank of Air Marshal.

The current VCAS is Air Marshal Amar Preet Singh. He succeeded Air Marshal  Sandeep Singh to the post on 1 February 2023. As Vice Chief, Air Marshal AP Singh will directly be in charge of IAF's ongoing capability build-up and visualizing its future technology requirements.

History
At the time of independence of India on 15 August 1947, Air Commodore Subroto Mukerjee was appointed Deputy Air Commander, Royal Indian Air Force, in addition to being Senior Air Staff Officer (SASO) at the newly-formed Air HQ. On 15 November the same year, he was promoted to the acting rank of Air Vice Marshal. In 1949, the RIAF was reorganised and the post was re-designated Deputy Chief of the Air Staff (DCAS). The DCAS continued to be the Deputy Air Commander. On 1 January 1963, the post of Vice Chief of the Air Staff was created and became the second-highest post of the Indian Air Force.

The office of VCAS was first held by D. A. R. Nanda. The appointment was then in the two-star rank of air vice marshal. On 15 January 1966, the office was raised to the three-star rank of Air Marshal and Pratap Chandra Lal was promoted to the rank.

Order of Precedence
The VCAS ranks at No. 23 on the Indian order of precedence, along with the Vice Chiefs of Staff of the Indian Army and Indian Navy and the Army Commanders (GOC-in-C), Naval Commanders (FOC-in-C) and Air Commanders (AOC-in-C). The VCAS is at the Apex Pay grade (Grade 17), with a monthly pay of ₹225,000 (US$3,200).

Appointees

** Went on to become Chief of the Air Staff

See also
 Chief of the Air Staff
 Deputy Chief of the Air Staff
 Vice Chief of the Army Staff
 Vice Chief of the Naval Staff

References

Vice Chiefs of Air Staff (India)
Air Staff, India
Indian Air Force
Indian military appointments
Indian Air Force appointments